Chase Provincial Park is a provincial park in British Columbia, Canada, located around Carina and Tomias Lakes,  north of Germansen Landing in the Omineca Mountains and just west of the Finlay Arm of Williston Lake. Approximately , it was established in 2001.

References

Provincial parks of British Columbia
Omineca Country
2001 establishments in British Columbia
Protected areas established in 2001